Ali is a collaborative studio album by Malian singer and guitarist Vieux Farka Touré and Texan trio Khruangbin. It consists of covers of songs by Vieux's father, Ali Farka Touré. It was released on September 23, 2022, on Dead Oceans.

Background
Vieux Farka Touré was looking for musicians to work with on an album that would honor his father, Malian guitarist Ali Farka Touré, who died in 2006. Vieux's manager suggested he collaborate with Houston, Texas-based musical trio Khruangbin, and Vieux met them at a pub in London. He decided to collaborate with them after attending their concert at the Roundhouse in London in 2018, impressed by their live show. They recorded the album over the course of a week in June 2019 at Khruangbin's barn in Burton, Texas. The songs on the album were selected by Ali's 11 children. After being put on hold due to the COVID-19 pandemic, the album was finalized in 2021.

Critical reception

Alexis Petridis of The Guardian awarded the album five stars out of five, calling the collaboration "an inspired choice" and adding, "It's an album you can easily lose yourself in, which is presumably the point." Janne Oinonen of The Line of Best Fit wrote, "Both parties benefit from the collaboration on Ali: Touré gets to paint the songs he loves with a wider palette without diluting the power of the source material, and Khruangbin adds some welcome grit to their smooth and hazy signature sound."

Track listing

Charts

References 

2022 albums
Khruangbin albums
Dead Oceans albums